Amygdalies is a village and a community of the Grevena municipality. Before the 2011 local government reform it was a part of the municipality of Grevena, of which it was a municipal district. The 2011 census recorded 446 residents in the village and 500 residents in the community. The community of Amygdalies covers an area of 28.331 km2.

Administrative division
The community of Amygdalies consists of two separate settlements: 
Agia Triada (population 32)
Amygdalies  (population 446)
Lochmi (population 22)
The aforementioned population figures are as of 2011.

Population
According to the 2011 census, the population of the settlement of Amygdalies was 446 people, a decrease of almost 26% compared to the previous census of 2001.

See also
 List of settlements in the Grevena regional unit

References

Populated places in Grevena (regional unit)
Villages in Greece